Leleka-100, also known as Stork, is Ukrainian unmanned aerial vehicle (UAV) designed for air reconnaissance. It was commissioned by the Armed Forces of Ukraine in 2021 and has been used extensively during the 2022 Russian invasion of Ukraine. It served as a base for the RAM II loitering munition.

References 

Unmanned aerial vehicles of Ukraine
Reconnaissance aircraft
Military equipment of the 2022 Russian invasion of Ukraine